Kuruthi Kalam is a 2021 Indian Tamil-language crime web series produced for MX Player, written and directed by Rajapandi and Danush. Produced by Applause Entertainment and Arpad Cine Factory, it stars Santhosh Prathap, Sanam Shetty and Ashok Kumar Balakrishnan in the lead roles. The web show is set against the fictional backdrop of brutal gang wars in Chennai, and was released on 22 January 2021.

Cast 
 Santhosh Prathap as Vijay
 Sanam Shetty as Maheshwari
 Ashok Kumar Balakrishnan as item Kumar
 Vincent Asokan as Venkatesh
 Eden Kuriakose as Subbulakshmi
 Santhana Bharathi as Paneerselvam
 Soundararaja as Arun
 G. Marimuthu as Periasamy
 Srikanth as Moorthy

Production
The series was shot in mid-2019 and was initially produced by Kutty Padmini and later by Applause Entertainment and Arpad Cine Factory.

Release 
The web series was released on 22 January 2021 on MX Player. A critic from Binged.com noted "in terms of filmmaking aesthetics and treatment, Kuruthi may be no Mirzapur, but it is a good time-pass if one were to ignore the crassness. The reviewer added "the non-linear screenplay always has a surprise in store which more than makes up for the absence of finesse in the execution". A review from entertainment portal LetsOTT noted it was a "time-worn gangster tale that does not surprise you anywhere".

References

External links 
 

MX Player original programming
Tamil-language web series
Tamil-language crime television series
2021 Tamil-language television series debuts